State elections were held in the Free State of Prussia on 26 January 1919. The elections were held a week after the elections to the federal National Assembly, and were the first elections of Prussian institutions held using proportional representation and with women's suffrage. The election was also the first truly free and fair Prussian election, as it was the first election held after the abolition of the Prussian three-class franchise, which grouped voters by the amount of taxes paid and gave disproportionate weight to the wealthy.

The State Assembly (Landesversammlung) functioned as both a constituent assembly and legislature. The parties of the "Weimar Coalition", the Social Democratic Party (SPD), Centre Party (Zentrum), and German Democratic Party (DDP), won a sweeping majority. Together they won 74.8% of the votes cast. SPD politician Paul Hirsch, who had been appointed Minister-President of Prussia in November 1918, continued in office, and was succeeded by Otto Braun in early 1920.

Results

Results by constituency

See also
 Elections in the Free State of Prussia
 Weimar Republic

Notes

References

External links

Prussia
1919
January 1919 events